The Leiden scale (°L) was used to calibrate low-temperature indirect measurements in the early twentieth century, by providing conventional values (in kelvins, then termed "degrees Kelvin") of helium vapour pressure. It was used below −183 °C, the starting point of the International Temperature Scale in the 1930s (Awbery 1934).

References
Berman, A.; Zemansky, M. W.; and Boorse, H. A.; Normal and Superconducting Heat Capacities of Lanthanum, Physical Review, Vol. 109, No. 1 (January 1958), pp. 70–76. Quote:
"The 1955 Leiden scale13 was used to convert helium vapor pressures into temperatures [...] (13) H. van Dijk and M. Durieux, in Progress in Low Temperature Physics II, edited by C. J. Gorter (North-Holland Publishing Company, Amsterdam, 1957), p. 461. In the region of calibration the 1955 Leiden scale, TL55, differs from the Clement scale, T55E, by less than 0.004 deg." (emphasis added)
Grebenkemper, C. J.; and Hagen, John P.; The Dielectric Constant of Liquid Helium, Physical Review, Vol. 80, No. 1 (October 1950), pp. 89–89. Quote:
 "The temperature scale used was the 1937 Leiden scale." (emphasis added)
Awbery, J. H.; Heat, Rep. Prog. Phys. 1934, No. 1, pp. 161–197 . Quote:
 "It should be mentioned that below −183 °C, the Leiden workers do not entirely agree with some of the other cryogenic laboratories, but use a scale of their own, generally known as the Leiden scale." (emphasis added)

Obsolete units of measurement
Scales of temperature